The Diocese of Trevico (Latin: Dioecesis Trevicensis) was a Roman Catholic diocese located in the town of Trevico in the province of Avellino, Campania, southern Italy. In 1818, it was suppressed to the Diocese of Lacedonia.

History
10th Century Established as Diocese of Trevico
1818 June 27: Suppressed to Diocese of Lacedonia
1968: Restored as Titular Episcopal See of Trevico

Ordinaries

Diocese of Trevico
Giacomo Torrella (27 Oct 1497 - 1521 Died)
Sixtus Signati (10 May 1521 - 1540 Died)
Sebastiano Graziani (19 Jan 1541 - 1548 Resigned)
Francesco de Leo (13 Jul 1548 - 1562 Died)
Agostino Folignatti (Molignatus) (27 May 1562 - 28 Jul 1564 Appointed, Bishop of Bertinoro)
Gerolamo Politi, O.P. (25 Oct 1564 - 1575 Died)
Benedetto Oliva (2 Sep 1575 - 13 Jan 1576 Died)
Antonio Balducci, O.P. (6 Feb 1576 - 1580 Died)
Alfonso Pardo (22 Jun 1580 - 1603 Died)
Gregorio Servanzi, O.P. (19 Dec 1603 - 1607 Resigned)
Gerolamo Mezzamico (10 Dec 1607 - 1636 Died)
Orazio Muscettola (7 Apr 1636 - 1638 Died)
Fabio Magnesi (19 Apr 1638 - 9 Jan 1640 Appointed, Bishop of Ostuni)
Silvestro D'Afflitto, C.R. (16 Jan 1640 - 23 Feb 1643 Appointed, Bishop of Lucera)
Alessandro Salzilla (13 Apr 1643 - 12 May 1646 Appointed, Bishop of Sant'Angelo dei Lombardi e Bisaccia)
Donato Pascasio, O.S.B. (9 Apr 1646 - 13 Feb 1664 Died)
Marco Vaccina (15 Sep 1664 - 26 Aug 1671 Died)
Luca Tisbia, C.R. (16 Nov 1671 - 25 Apr 1693 Died)
Francesco Protonobilissimo (24 Aug 1693 - 1 Jul 1701 Died)
Simeone Veglini (11 Dec 1702 - 4 Mar 1720 Appointed, Bishop of Tricarico)
Domenico Filomarini, C.R. (15 Apr 1720 - Jan 1733 Died)
Francesco Antonio Leonardis (11 May 1733 - 15 Jul 1739 Appointed, Bishop of Bisceglie)
Bernardo Onorato Buonocore (15 Jul 1739 - 31 Dec 1773 Died)
Giuseppe Pasquale Rogani (9 May 1774 - 21 Jun 1791 Died)
Agostino Gregorio Golini (27 Feb 1792 Confirmed - 1813 Died)

1818 June 27: Suppressed to the Diocese of Lacedonia

References

Catholic titular sees in Europe